Stephen Douglas Ellis  (born 1968) is a Canadian politician serving as the member of Parliament for the riding of Cumberland—Colchester. He defeated Lenore Zann at the 2021 Canadian federal election.

Education
In 1993, Ellis graduated from the Dalhousie University Faculty of Medicine with a Doctor of Medicine.

Career
Ellis was a member of the Royal Canadian Air Force for nine years, attaining the rank of Captain. From 1999 to 2021, Ellis worked as a family physician in Truro for 22 years.

References

External links

Members of the House of Commons of Canada from Nova Scotia
Conservative Party of Canada MPs
21st-century Canadian politicians
Living people
1968 births